Zlatna Dolina is Edo Maajka's first soundtrack album, released in 2003. One song from the album is Maajka's, the title track. Other songs were by various rappers and Disciplinska Komisija. The single "Zlatna Dolina" was a major Bosnian hit and was part of the soundtrack to Ljeto u Zlatnoj Dolini.

Track listing
 "Zlatna Dolina" (Golden Valley) by Edo Maajka
 "Jeste Li Spremni" (Are You Ready) by DJ Cekic
 "Jaran" (Friend) by Rima D
 "BTS" (Burn the System) by Disciplinska Komisija & Billy
 "Suze" (Tears) by Marchelo & Edo Maajka
 "Home Team" by DJ Cekic & Amon Ra featuring Verbalistics
 "Ustekaj Se" (Plug Yourself In) by Sove
 "Svijet" (World) by Mucenicka Grupa
 "Pismo Majci" (Letter to Mom) by Rima D
 "Amon Racija" by Amon Ra

2003 albums